William Wild may refer to:
 William Wild (cricketer)
 William Wild (politician)